USS New York (LPD-21) is a , and the fifth ship of the United States Navy named after the state of New York.

Naming
Shortly after September 11, 2001, Governor of New York George E. Pataki wrote a letter to Secretary of the Navy Gordon R. England requesting that the Navy bestow the name New York on a surface warship involved in the Global War on Terrorism in honor of the victims of the September 11 attacks. Pataki wrote that he understood state names were reserved for submarines, but he asked for special consideration so the name could be given to a surface ship. The request was approved on 28 August 2002.

Sister ships names announced

Construction

A symbolic amount of steel salvaged from the World Trade Center after it was destroyed in the September 11 attacks was used in her construction.

The ship is the first to be designed fully from the CAD-screen up to support both of the Marines' primary mobility capabilities, LCAC landing craft and MV-22B Osprey aircraft.

The contract to build New York was awarded to Northrop Grumman Ship Systems of New Orleans, Louisiana, in 2003. New York was under construction in New Orleans at the time of Hurricane Katrina in 2005.

 of the steel used in the ship's construction came from the rubble of the World Trade Center; this represents less than one thousandth of the total weight of the ship. The steel was melted down at Amite Foundry and Machine in Amite, Louisiana, to cast the ship's bow section. It was poured into the molds on 9 September 2003, with  cast to form the ship's "stem bar"—part of the ship's bow. The foundry workers reportedly treated it with "reverence usually accorded to religious relics," gently touching it as they walked by. One worker delayed his retirement after 40 years of working to be part of the project.

Christening and delivery
New York was christened on 1 March 2008, in a ceremony at Avondale Shipyard in New Orleans. Ship sponsor Dotty England, wife of Deputy Defense Secretary Gordon R. England, smashed the traditional champagne bottle on the ship's bow and christened the ship New York. Several dignitaries were in attendance, including Louisiana Congressman William J. Jefferson, members of the New York City Police Department and the New York City Fire Department, and family members of victims of the September 11 attacks. The champagne bottle did not break the first time it was struck against the hull of the ship, but the second attempt was successful.

The ship was delivered to the Navy on 21 August 2009 at New Orleans. She set sail for Norfolk, Virginia, on 13 October 2009. On 2 November 2009 the ship passed the World Trade Center site for the first time and gave the site a 21-gun salute.

Commissioning and trials

The commissioning ceremony for New York took place on 7 November 2009, in New York City. Speakers included Secretary of State Hillary Clinton, Secretary of the Navy Ray Mabus, Governor David Paterson, Mayor Michael Bloomberg, Chief of Naval Operations Admiral Gary Roughead, and Commandant of the Marine Corps General James T. Conway. Approximately one in seven of the plank owners are from New York state, a larger number than usual.

Propulsion
New York uses four Fairbanks-Morse license-built MAN Colt-Pielstick PC2.5 STC sequentially turbocharged marine diesel engines with inboard rotating Rolls-Royce controllable-pitch propellers. The V16-cylinder Colt-Pielstick PC2.5 STC engine is intended for use on ships requiring high propulsion power combined with a lightweight installation. Each V16 PC2.5 STC diesel engine weighs  dry without flywheel.

On 11 January 2010, the Navy announced that the ship would have to undergo repairs for faulty engine parts after inspectors discovered the "premature failure" of bearings on the ship's main propulsion diesel engines during a week-long sea trial following the November commissioning.

Service history

2012
On 10 June 2012 the ship was deployed for the first time to the Strait of Hormuz and the Persian Gulf region.

2014

In June 2014, the ship was used to transport Ahmed Abu Khattala, suspected mastermind of the 2012 Benghazi attack on the American diplomatic mission at Benghazi, back to the United States.

2017
On 11 September 2017, New York arrived off the Florida coast for Hurricane Irma relief, 16 years to the day after the 9/11/2001 terrorist attacks.

2018
New York supported the reception night for the 23rd International Seapower Symposium at the Naval War College in Newport, RI in September 2018.  In November, the ship supported Exercise Trident Juncture, a large scale NATO exercise involving more than 50,000 personnel, 65 ships, and 250 aircraft, including 14,000 American troops, a Carrier Strike Group (CSG) and an Amphibious Readiness Group (ARG).

Gallery

References

External links 

 

 

2007 ships
Northrop Grumman
San Antonio-class amphibious transport docks
Ships built in Bridge City, Louisiana
World Trade Center